This article lists all power stations in Morocco.

Hydroelectric

Thermal

Solar

Wind

See also 

 List of power stations in Africa
 List of largest power stations in the world
 Energy in Morocco
 Energy policy of Morocco

References 

Morocco
Power stations